SparX is the pop group formed by the top five winners of the first season of Popstars Indonesia in 2003. They launched their self-titled debut album in 2004, spawning a one-hit wonder Sayangi Aku Apa Adanya. The name SparX originates from the word sparkling to reflect the sparkle in the talent of each member.

Recent Activity
Popstars Indonesia has not launched another season since. The band members are still bound to a 10-year contract with Popstars, but to date has no scheduled recording projects or public appearances as a band. However, the band has not yet disbanded and its members are known to say that they are currently "assembling material for their next album", whose due date is yet unannounced. The members are currently working other jobs individually, including singing at shows, acting for movies and TV, supporting recording projects for more prominent artists, side projects in Contemporary Christian Music and Performing Arts, hosting shows, managing a record shop, and teaching kindergarten.

Members
 Dandy Sosiawan Ginanjar
 Dini Alamanda Arizully
 Handiyanto Godjali "Andy Lee"
 Jelita Elsa Tanjung
 Josiah Joko "Jojo" Iswanto

Trivia

 In 2007 Jojo was a top 12 finalist of the interactive reality show/comedy camp Kampus Extravaganza on Trans TV. He auditioned in Semarang. While Jojo did not make it to the show's final selection of cast member, he now acts in another popular Trans TV sitcom, Akhirnya Datang Juga (adapted from a Western skit show Thank God You're Here).
 Jojo and Dandy have a side project with Indonesian diva Imaniar Nursaid called "The Bloods". The trio sings R&B live performances in various venues in Jakarta.
 Andy Lee was currently a popular radio chart show host and Master Of Ceremony in Bogor and in December 2020 he released his first single "TEGA" which available on all digital platforms under RAJA MUSIC DIGITAL

External links
 SparX full story by DiscTarra (Indonesian)

Indonesian pop music groups